This is a list of major earthquakes by the dollar value of property (public and private) losses directly attributable to the earthquake. Only earthquakes that have caused over $1 billion US dollars are listed here. Rank values are assigned based on inflation-adjusted comparison of property damage in US dollars. Wherever possible, indirect and socioeconomic losses are excluded. Damage estimates for particular earthquakes may vary over time as more data becomes available. Losses from earthquake–induced landslides and tsunamis are also be included.

List of earthquakes by cost

See also
List of earthquakes
List of natural disasters by cost
List of disasters by cost

References

Cost
History of insurance
Cost
Earthquakes